Bodden Town is a district of the island of Grand Cayman in the Cayman Islands. It takes its name from the village of Bodden Town, which is located on the south shore of the island in the central portion of the district. Other towns in the district of Bodden Town are Savannah and Newlands, both in the western portion of the district.

Populated places in the Cayman Islands
Grand Cayman